Stuart Smith may refer to:

Stuart Lyon Smith (1938–2020), politician, leader of the Ontario Liberal Party (1976-1982), psychiatrist, academic and public servant in Ontario, Canada
Stuart Saunders Smith (born 1948), American composer and percussionist
Stuart Tyson Smith (born 1960), American Egyptologist
Stuart Smith (actor) (born 1954), British-Australian actor
Stuart Smith (game designer), American computer game designer
Stuart Ernest Smith (1915–2007), ice hockey player for the Montreal Canadiens
Stuart Smith (ice hockey) (born 1960), ice hockey player for the Hartford Whalers
Stuart Smith (musician) (born 1956), British rock-blues guitarist and songwriter
Stuart H. Smith (born 1960), American plaintiff attorney
Stuart Smith (general) (born 1963), Australian Army general
Stuart Smith (politician), New Zealand politician
Stuart Smith (cricketer) (1868–?), Irish cricketer

See also
Steuart Smith (born 1952), guitarist with the Eagles
Stewart Smith (disambiguation)